"Wildwood Days" is a song released by Bobby Rydell in 1963.

Rydell's version spent 9 weeks on the Billboard Hot 100 chart, peaking at No. 17, while reaching No. 14 in Australia, and No. 21 on Canada's CHUM Hit Parade.

Background
The subject of the song is Wildwood, New Jersey, a city famous for its nightlife, which was a popular location for rock and roll performances at the time the song was recorded. 
It eventually became the official anthem of the city, and is played on the boardwalk's stereo system routinely. The song was also featured in commercials for Wildwood.
A mural on the Wildwood boardwalk (painted in 2014) honors Rydell whose song put the community into the national spotlight.

Chart performance

Cover versions
In 1966, Bobby Curtola released a version of the song, which reached No. 36 on Canada's "RPM 100".

References

1963 songs
1963 singles
Bobby Rydell songs
Cameo-Parkway Records singles
Songs with lyrics by Kal Mann
Songs written by Dave Appell
Wildwood, New Jersey